Jan Schreuder (12 February 1704 in Hamburg – 16 January 1764 in Batavia, Dutch East Indies)  was the 30th Governor of Zeylan during the Dutch period in Ceylon. He was appointed on 17 March 1757 and was Governor until 17 September 1762. He was succeeded by Lubbert Jan baron van Eck.

References

1704 births
1764 deaths
Governors of Dutch Ceylon
18th-century Dutch people
People from Hamburg